The Divisiones Regionales de Fútbol (in Catalan: Divisions Regionals de Futbol) in Catalonia are organized by the Federació Catalana de Futbol.

League chronology
Timeline

Primera Catalana 

The Primera Catalana is the first level for the Catalan football teams. It is held every year and it stands at the sixth level of Spanish football with teams five promotions away from the top division. Teams from this league progress into the Tercera División RFEF Group 5.

Former Regional Preferente champions

Segona Catalana 

The Segona Catalana is at the seventh level of the Spanish football league system.

Tercera Catalana 

Tercera Catalana is at the eighth level of competition of the Spanish Football League in Catalonia.

Quarta Catalana 

Quarta Catalana is at the ninth level of competition of the Spanish Football League system and is the lowest level in Catalonia.

External links 
Federació Catalana de Futbol

Catalan football competitions
Divisiones Regionales de Fútbol